Mario Klabin Xavier Romancini (born December 15, 1987 in Telêmaco Borba) is a professional racing driver from Brazil.

Romancini started his racing career in 2006 in the Brazilian Formula Renault 2.0 series. Driving for the Full Time Racing Team, he took two podium finishes, including one race win, to finish the season in fifth place. After his impressive debut season, Romancini moved up to the South American Formula Three championship in 2007 with leading team Cesário F3. During the season he took ten podium places in fourteen races, including two wins, to finish runner-up in the championship behind team-mate Clemente de Faria, Jr.

In November 2007, Romancini took part in World Series by Renault testing at both Paul Ricard and Valencia, driving for Epsilon Euskadi, Prema Powerteam and the reigning champions Tech 1 Racing. In January 2008 he was signed by Epsilon Euskadi to partner Frenchman and fellow rookie Alexandre Marsoin. During the season, he scored two points finishes and was lying 28th in the standings when he left the team due to sponsorship problems with two rounds of the championship remaining. He was replaced by former Epsilon driver Filipe Albuquerque. He has signed to race for Andersen Racing to race in the Firestone Indy Lights Series in 2009. He captured his first win in the series in his fifth start from the pole at the Milwaukee Mile. He ended the season with a victory in Homestead in the 6th place.

Romancini competed full–time in the IZOD INDYCAR Series for the 2010 season for Conquest Racing. He started his first Indianapolis 500-Mile Race, where he finished 13th as the highest finishing rookie. Romancini also received sponsorship from Armando Montelongo, TV celebrity from Flip This House.

Motorsports career results

Career summary

Complete Formula Renault 3.5 Series results
(key)

† Driver did not finish the race, but was classified as he completed more than 90% of the race distance.

American open–wheel racing results
(key) (Races in bold indicate pole position) (Races in italics indicate fastest lap)

Indy Lights

IndyCar Series

 
Reference:

Indianapolis 500

References

External links
Mario Romancini official site
IndyCar Driver Page
Mario Romancini career details

1987 births
People from Telêmaco Borba
Living people
Brazilian people of Italian descent
Brazilian racing drivers
Brazilian IndyCar Series drivers
Stock Car Brasil drivers
Formula 3 Sudamericana drivers
Brazilian Formula Renault 2.0 drivers
Indy Lights drivers
IndyCar Series drivers
Indianapolis 500 drivers
Racing drivers from São Paulo
World Series Formula V8 3.5 drivers
Lafer-Klabin family
Sportspeople from Paraná (state)
Conquest Racing drivers
Epsilon Euskadi drivers
Rahal Letterman Lanigan Racing drivers